The M66, also known as the Bury Easterly Bypass, is a motorway in Lancashire and Greater Manchester, England.

Historically the motorway used to continue southward around the east side of Manchester, but in 1998 this section was renumbered and became part of the M60 Manchester orbital motorway.

Route
The M66 starts at the Simister Island, a junction with the M60 and M62, and heads north as a continuation of the M60 as a three-lane dual carriageway. It passes the eastern edge of Whitefield, through junction 3, goes underneath the East Lancashire Railway and enters the suburbs of Bury. It reduces to two lanes at junction 2 and then climbs onto an elevated section, passing through a post war housing estate. At the end of the elevated road, a third climbing lane is added to the summit of the hill. The road then runs to the east of Ramsbottom and the East Lancashire Railway and ends near Edenfield, where the road continues as the A56 dual carriageway.

History

In 1949 a report, the Road Plan for Lancashire, proposed the construction of Route 9 which would link north east Manchester with Burnley and Blackburn via Route 8.  Originally planned to be an all purpose road. the route was redesignated as a motorway prior to construction.  The first section (the so-called Middleton Link) was opened in 1971.  On the Department for Transport's 2002 Roads List this link is listed as the M68. Construction then began on the southern section of the Bury bypass (junctions  4 to 3) in February 1973 with this opening in August 1975.  Immediately after construction began on the northern section (junctions 3 to terminus) with this opening in 1978.

The motorway was planned to run down to Stockport where it would meet the M63 and the proposed A6(M) motorway.  The first part of this built was the section from the M67 to the M63 (now junctions 24 to 27 of the M60) with construction beginning in 1986 and it opening to traffic in 1989.

The final section of the motorway was to be between the M67 and the Middleton Link. Construction began on this in 1995. In 1998 it was decided to rename various sections of motorway (parts of the M62 and M66 and the whole of the M63) around Manchester to the M60 to form the "Manchester Outer Ring Road".  All sections of the M66 south of the M62 were therefore redesignated as the M60.  This final section subsequently opened in 2000.

North of the M66, the road was built as the A56, an all purpose A road which connects with the M65 at junction 8.

Legislation
Each motorway in England requires that a Statutory Instrument be published, detailing the route of the road, before it can be built. The dates given on these Statutory Instruments relate to when the document was published, and not when the road was built. Provided below is an incomplete list of the Statutory Instruments relating to the route of the M66.

 Statutory Instrument 1973 No. 1142: M66 Motorway (Bury Easterly Bypass Northern Section) And Connecting Roads Scheme 1973 S.I. 1973/1142
 Statutory Instrument 1996 No. 2158: M66 Motorway (Bury Easterly Bypass Northern Section) (Junction 2 Southbound Off-Slip) (Detrunking) Order 1996 S.I. 1996/2158
 Statutory Instrument 1996 No. 2159: M66 Motorway (Bury Easterly Bypass Northern Section) And Connecting Roads Scheme 1973 (Variation) Scheme 1996 S.I. 1996/2159

Junctions
{| class="plainrowheaders wikitable"
|-
!scope=col|County
!scope=col|Location
!scope=col|mi
!scope=col|km
!scope=col|Junction
!scope=col|Destinations
!scope=col|Notes
|-
|Lancashire
|Edenfield
|0
|0
| bgcolor="ddffdd" |—
| bgcolor="ddffdd" |  - Haslingden
| bgcolor="ddffdd" |Road continues from A56
|-
|rowspan="4"|Greater Manchester
|—
|2.2
|3.6
| bgcolor="ffdddd" |1
| bgcolor="ffdddd" |  - Edenfield, Bury
| bgcolor="ffdddd" |No Southbound exit or Northbound entrance
|-
|rowspan="2"|Bury
|5.5
|8.8
|2
|  - Bury, Heywood, Rochdale
|
|-
|6.4
|10.2
|3
|Whitefield, Heywood
|
|-
|—
|8.4
|13.6
|4
|  - Eccles, Stockport, Ashton under Lyne  - Leeds, Hull
|
|-

*Ceremonial Counties
Coordinate list

See also
List of motorways in the United Kingdom
M60 motorway

References

External links

Lancashire County Council Historic Highways – Road Plan for Lancashire 1949
The Motorway Archive – M66

6-0066
6-0066
Metropolitan Borough of Bury